P. S. Dupont High School is a historic high school building located at Wilmington, New Castle County, Delaware. It was built in 1934, and is a four-story, "E"-shaped, red brick building in a Colonial Revival / Neo-Georgian style.  It has a hipped roof covered with dark reddish-brown shingles, topped by a wood, three-level tower and cupola that ends in a multiple-sided, bell-like copper roof and weather vane. The school is named for Pierre S. du Pont (1870–1954).

It was one of three traditional public high schools in Wilmington, and initially did not accept black students, who were required to go to Howard High School. It was disestablished after Wilmington was divided into multiple school districts in the 1980s.

It was added to the National Register of Historic Places in 1986. The school is currently used as a middle school in the Brandywine School District.

References

School buildings on the National Register of Historic Places in Delaware
Colonial Revival architecture in Delaware
School buildings completed in 1934
Schools in Wilmington, Delaware
National Register of Historic Places in Wilmington, Delaware
Public Works Administration in Delaware
1934 establishments in Delaware
Public high schools in Delaware